The Royal Bank Building refers to two office buildings built for the Royal Bank of Canada in the Financial District of Toronto, Ontario, Canada:

The 20-storey Royal Bank Building, located on the northeast corner of Yonge and King Streets, was completed in 1915 and designed by the architectural firm Ross and Macdonald.  The City of Toronto designated the building under the Ontario Heritage Act in 1976.  The building is also known by its municipal address, 2 King Street East.  At 90 metres in height, the building was the tallest in Canada until 1928.

The 12-storey Royal Bank Building, located at 20 King Street West between Yonge and Bay Streets, served as the bank's Toronto offices until the Royal Bank Plaza was completed in 1977. The building was designed by architects Marani, Morris, & Allen. It is still one of several buildings in Toronto's downtown core occupied by the Royal Bank.  Construction on the building commenced with the laying of the cornerstone by then Royal Bank of Canada Chairman James Allan in 1964.

References

 TO Built - 2 King Street East
 TO Built - Royal Bank Building
 

Buildings and structures in Toronto
Royal Bank of Canada
Historic bank buildings in Canada